S. rubra  may refer to:
 Sarracenia rubra, the sweet pitcher plant, a carnivorous plant species
 Spergularia rubra, a plant species native of Malta, Sicily and Algiers

See also
 Rubra (disambiguation)